On the Isle of Samoa is a 1950 American south seas adventure film directed by William Berke and starring Jon Hall. It was a rare villainous role for Hall.

Plot
A thief crashes on a tropical island.

Cast
 Jon Hall as Kenneth Crandall
 Susan Cabot as Moana
 Raymond Greenleaf as Peter Appleton
 Henry Marco as Karaki
 Al Kikume as Chief Tihoti
 Rosa Turich as Waini

Production
Susan Cabot was hired to co star in March 1950.

References

External links
On the Isle of Samoa at BFI
On the Isle of Samoa at IMDb
On the Isle of Samoa at TCMDB

1950 films
1950 adventure films
American adventure films
Films directed by William A. Berke
Films set in Oceania
Columbia Pictures films
American black-and-white films
1950s English-language films
1950s American films